Bertram Schmitt (born September 9, 1958) is a German jurist. He was a judge at the Bundesgerichtshof and has been a judge of the International Criminal Court since 2015.

Career

Early career
Between 2005 and 2015, Schmitt served as judge at the Federal Court of Justice (BGH), Germany's supreme court for civil and criminal matters.

In 2009, Schmitt was appointed as an ad-hoc judge at the European Court of Human Rights (ECHR). From 2009, he represented Germany on the Eurojust Joint Supervisory Body in The Hague.

Since 2000, Schmitt has been an adjunct professor for criminal law, criminal procedure and criminology at the University of Würzburg. He is one of two authors of the standard German commentary on criminal procedure,  which includes the annotation of the European Convention on Human Rights (ECtHR). In 2010, he unsuccessfully ran against Angelika Nußberger in the election to succeed Renate Jaeger as the judge representing Germany at the European Court of Human Rights.

Judge of the International Criminal Court, 2015-present
In December 2014, Schmitt was proposed as a judge at the International Criminal Court by the German government. On December 10, 2014, he was elected in the sixth ballot and assumed office on March 11, 2015. He serves in the trial division of the court.

In his capacity as judge on the Trial Chamber VII, Schmitt in 2017 added a year to Jean-Pierre Bemba's 18-year jail term following his conviction for attempting to bribe witnesses during his war crimes trial.

References

1958 births
Living people
German legal scholars
International Criminal Court judges
21st-century German judges
German judges of international courts and tribunals
Judges of the Federal Court of Justice